Gárdony is a district in central-eastern part of Fejér County. Gárdony is also the name of the town where the district seat is found. The district is located in the Central Transdanubia Statistical Region.

Geography 
Gárdony District borders with Bicske District to the north, Martonvásár District to the east, Dunaújváros District to the southeast, Székesfehérvár District to the south and west. The number of the inhabited places in Gárdony District is 10.

Municipalities 
The district has 2 towns and 8 villages.
(ordered by population, as of 1 January 2012)

The bolded municipalities are cities.

See also
List of cities and towns in Hungary

References

External links
 Postal codes of the Gárdony District

Districts in Fejér County